Reinder Aart Nummerdor (born 10 September 1976) is a Dutch volleyball player, who represented his native country at five consecutive Summer Olympics. Two times as a member of the indoor volleyball team in 2000 and 2004, and 3 more times after switching to beach volleyball.

Having finished in fifth place in Sydney, Australia he ended up in ninth place with the Dutch Men's National Team four years later in Athens, Greece. He earned a total number of 349 caps, and teamed up with Richard Schuil after the Athens Games for a career in beach volleyball. On 12 May 2007 in Bahrain, the two won their first FIVB World Tour gold medal. They won a silver medal in the same tour on 1 July in Stavanger.  They reached the quarter-finals at the 2008 Summer Olympics, and the semi-finals in 2012.  They lost in the bronze medal match against Plavins and Smedins of Latvia. Following Schuil's retirement, Nummerdor paired with Christiaan Varenhorst.

Nummerdor is married to the Dutch volleyball player Manon Nummerdor-Flier.

References

External links 
 Dutch Olympic Committee

1976 births
Living people
Dutch men's volleyball players
Dutch men's beach volleyball players
Volleyball players at the 2000 Summer Olympics
Volleyball players at the 2004 Summer Olympics
Beach volleyball players at the 2008 Summer Olympics
Beach volleyball players at the 2012 Summer Olympics
Beach volleyball players at the 2016 Summer Olympics
Olympic volleyball players of the Netherlands
Olympic beach volleyball players of the Netherlands
People from Kampen, Overijssel
Beach volleyball defenders
Sportspeople from Overijssel
20th-century Dutch people
21st-century Dutch people